MariaDB is a community-developed, commercially supported fork of the MySQL relational database management system (RDBMS), intended to remain free and open-source software under the GNU General Public License. Development is led by some of the original developers of MySQL, who forked it due to concerns over its acquisition by Oracle Corporation in 2009.

MariaDB is intended to maintain high compatibility with MySQL, with library binary parity and exact matching with MySQL APIs and commands, allowing it in many cases to function as drop-in replacement for MySQL. However, new features are diverging. It includes new storage engines like Aria, ColumnStore, and MyRocks.

Its lead developer/CTO is Michael "Monty" Widenius, one of the founders of MySQL AB and the founder of Monty Program AB.  On 16 January 2008, MySQL AB announced that it had agreed to be acquired by Sun Microsystems for approximately $1 billion. The acquisition completed on 26 February 2008. Sun was then bought the following year by Oracle Corporation.  MariaDB is named after Widenius' younger daughter, Maria. (MySQL is named after his other daughter, My.)

Features

MariaDB Server

Versioning 
MariaDB version numbers follow MySQL's numbering scheme up to version 5.5. Thus, MariaDB 5.5 offers all of the MySQL 5.5 features. There exists a gap in MySQL versions between 5.1 and 5.5, while MariaDB issued 5.2 and 5.3 point releases.

Since specific new features have been developed in MariaDB, the developers decided that a major version number change was necessary.

Licensing 
The MariaDB Foundation mentions:MariaDB Server will remain Free and Open Source Software licensed under GPLv2, independent of any commercial entities.

Third-party software 
MariaDB's API and protocol are compatible with those used by MySQL, plus some features to support native non-blocking operations and progress reporting. This means that all connectors, libraries and applications which work with MySQL should also work on MariaDB—whether or not they support its native features. On this basis, Fedora developers replaced MySQL with MariaDB in Fedora 19, out of concerns that Oracle was making MySQL a more closed software project. OpenBSD likewise in April 2013 dropped MySQL for MariaDB 5.5.

However, for recent MySQL features, MariaDB either has no equivalent yet (like geographic function) or deliberately chose not to be 100% compatible (like GTID, JSON). The list of incompatibilities grows longer with each version.

Prominent users 
MariaDB is used at ServiceNow, DBS Bank, Google, Mozilla, and, since 2013, the Wikimedia Foundation.

Several Linux distributions and BSD operating systems include MariaDB. Some default to MariaDB, such as Arch Linux, Manjaro, Debian (from Debian 9), Fedora (from Fedora 19), Red Hat Enterprise Linux (from RHEL 7 in June 2014), CentOS (from CentOS 7), Mageia (from Mageia 2), openSUSE (from openSUSE 12.3 Dartmouth), SUSE Linux Enterprise Server (from SLES 12), Slackware Linux (from Slackware 14.1), OpenBSD (from 5.7), and FreeBSD.

MariaDB Foundation 

The MariaDB Foundation was founded in 2012 to oversee the development of MariaDB. The current CEO of the MariaDB Foundation is Kaj Arnö since February 2019.

Notable sponsors of MariaDB Foundation 
The most notable sponsors of MariaDB Foundation are Alibaba Cloud, Tencent Cloud, Microsoft, MariaDB Corporation Ab, ServiceNow, Schaffhausen Institute of Technology, IBM, and DBS Bank.

The Foundation also works with technology partners, e.g. Google tasked one of its engineers to work at the MariaDB Foundation in 2013.

History of MariaDB Foundation 
In December 2012 Michael Widenius, David Axmark, and Allan Larsson announced the formation of a foundation that would oversee the development of MariaDB.

At the time of founding in 2013 the Foundation wished to create a governance model similar to that used by the Eclipse Foundation. The Board appointed the Eclipse Foundation's Executive Director Mike Milinkovich as an advisor to lead the transition.

The MariaDB Foundation's first sponsor and member was MariaDB Corporation Ab that joined in 2014 after initial agreements on the division of ownership and roles between the MariaDB Foundation and MariaDB Corporation. E.g. MariaDB is a registered trademark of MariaDB Corporation Ab, used under license by the MariaDB Foundation. MariaDB Corporation Ab was originally founded in 2010 as SkySQL Corporation Ab, but changed name in 2014 to reflect its role as the main driving force behind the development of MariaDB server and the biggest support-provider for it. Foundation CEO at the time, Simon Phipps quit in 2014 on the sale of the MariaDB trademark to SkySQL. He later said: "I quit as soon as it was obvious the company was not going to allow an independent foundation."

Simon Phipps was CEO of the Foundation from April 2013 to 2014. Otto Kekäläinen was the CEO from January 2015 to September 2018. Arjen Lentz was appointed CEO of the Foundation in October 2018 and resigned in December 2018. Kaj Arnö joined as the CEO on 1 February 2019. Eric Herman is the current chairman of the board.

MariaDB Corporation Ab
Initially, the development activities around MariaDB were based entirely on open source and non-commercial. To build a global business, MariaDB Corporation Ab was founded in 2010 by Patrik Backman, Ralf Wahlsten, Kaj Arnö, Max Mether, Ulf Sandberg, Mick Carney and Michael "Monty" Widenius. The current CEO of MariaDB Corporation is Michael Howard.

MariaDB Corporation Ab was formed after a merger between SkySQL Corporation Ab and Monty Program on 23 April 2013. Subsequently, the name was changed on 1 October 2014 to reflect the company's role as the main driving force behind the development of MariaDB Server and the largest support-provider for it.

MariaDB Corporation Ab announced in February 2022 its intention to become a publicly listed company on the New York Stock Exchange (NYSE).

Products of MariaDB Corporation Ab 
MariaDB Corporation Ab is a contributor to the MariaDB Server, develops the MariaDB database connectors (C, C++, Java 7, Java 8, Node.js, ODBC, Python, R2DBC) as well as the MariaDB Enterprise Platform, including the MariaDB Enterprise Server, optimized for production deployments. The MariaDB Enterprise Platform includes MariaDB MaxScale, an advanced database proxy, MariaDB ColumnStore, a columnar storage engine for interactive ad hoc analytics, MariaDB Xpand, a distributed SQL storage engine for massive transactional scalability, and MariaDB Enterprise Server, an enhanced, hardened and secured version of the community server. MariaDB Corporation offers the MariaDB Enterprise Platform in the cloud under the name SkySQL, a database-as-a-service.

SkySQL
SkySQL general availability was announced on March 31, 2020. This database-as-a-service offering from MariaDB is a managed cloud service on Google Cloud Platform.

SkySQL is a hybrid database offering that includes a column family store, object store, distributed SQL database with both a transactional and analytical query engine. The combination allows developers to use a single database for multiple use cases and avoid a proliferation of databases.

The benefits of using this offering vs Amazon RDS or Microsoft Azure Database's MariaDB services offerings are versioning (SkySQL ensures users are on the most recent product release) as well as having analytics and transactional support.

Investors in MariaDB Corporation Ab 
MariaDB Corporation has been funded with a total of $123M combined in its A-series funding round in 2012, B-series in 2013-2016 and C-series in 2017–2022. It is undergoing a D-series round in 2022 aiming at an additional $104M in combination with its intention to become a listed company on the New York Stock Exchange (NYSE).

Some of the initial A-series investors in MariaDB Corporation Ab were e.g. OpenOcean and Tesi (Finnish Industry Investment Ltd). The B-series round was led by Intel in 2013 which itself invested $20M. In 2017 Alibaba led the C-series with a $27M investment into MariaDB in addition to a €25M investment by the European Investment Bank.

See also

 Comparison of database administration tools
 Comparison of MySQL database engines
 Comparison of relational database management systems
 Multi-master replication

References

Further reading

External links

 MariaDB Corporation website

 
2009 software
Client-server database management systems
Cross-platform software
Free database management systems
MySQL
Relational database management systems
Relational database management software for Linux
Software forks
Software using the GPL license
Free software companies